Line 3, Hanoi Metro (Nhon - Hanoi Station section), also known as Văn Miếu Line (Temple of Literature Line), is one of the under-construction mass transit railway line in the Hanoi Metro network, will be the second line to be used in the metro network. This line is invested by Hanoi Metropolitan Railway Management Board and divided into two phases. 

Phase 1 is 12.5 km long and consists of 12 stations in total, with 8.5 km elevated and 4 km underground, stretching from the city's western suburbs - Nhon - to the city center on Tran Hung Dao Street near Hanoi Railway Station. Its services are scheduled for completion in 2022 to 2023.

20% of Hanoi's people in 6 districts Ba Dinh, Cau Giay, Dong Da, Hoan Kiem, Nam Từ Liêm and Bắc Từ Liêm can benefit from this line.

Budget 

Beside 276 million euros from the Hanoi city's budget, the project also receives 726 million euros from the four donors - the French government (DGT), French Development Agency (AFD), Asian Development Bank (ADB), and European Investment Bank (EIB).

Construction progress 

Implementation of the project is delayed by four years compared to the original schedule with completion expected in 2021. As of March 2017, the project has achieved 30% physical progress over the elapsed project life of 9 years. However, due to land clearance issues, the project completion is expected to be delayed to 2023.

Route 

Line 3: Nhon - Hanoi Station section starts from Nhon - to National Highway 32 - Cau Dien - Mai Dich - Ring road 3 intersection - Cau Giay (ring road 2 intersection) - Kim Ma - Giang Vo - Cat Linh - Quoc Tu Giam and ends at Tran Hung Dao Street, in front of Hanoi Station.

Stations 

12 stations including 8 elevated stations (Nhon, Minh Khai, Phu Dien, Cau Dien, Le Duc Tho, Vietnam National University, Chua Ha, Cau Giay) and 4 underground stations (Kim Ma, Cat Linh, Van Mieu, Hanoi Station), with concourse level, elevators and lifts. The railway platform is 109 m long.

Social and environmental impacts 

 Land acquisition and resettlement: To transform Hanoi's transport system, the government may acquire some land along segments of the line, and around Nhon depot. A Resettlement Plan has been prepared and updated for the project, which is consistent with the Asian Development Bank's Safeguards Policy Statement, and the updated Resettlement and Compensation Policies of the government of Vietnam.
 Environmental management: The development of the line involves significant construction works, which can generate adverse environmental impacts. These have been assessed in an international standard environmental impact assessment. The most significant impacts affecting Hanoi citizens during construction may include excessive dust and noise, traffic disturbances, and the relocation of mature trees along the metro alignment. All contractors have developed and are implementing robust environmental management plans and engineering solutions to minimize environmental impacts, and respond to any event. Overall, environmental benefits including improved air quality, reduced greenhouse gas emission and enhanced community health and safety will significantly outweigh the adverse environmental impacts.

See also 

 Transport in Vietnam
 Ho Chi Minh City Metro
 Megaproject
 Hanoi Metro

References

External links

Rapid transit in Vietnam
Hanoi Metro
Proposed public transport in Asia
2023 in rail transport